is a Japanese actor and tarento who has appeared in a number of television series, feature films, and stage productions. He is represented by Stardust Promotion. He graduated from Rikkyo University.

Filmography

TV drama

Stage

Films

Internet

Radio

Anime television

Video games

Music videos

Other TV programmes

Advertisements

Magazines

References

External links
 

Stardust Promotion artists
Rikkyo University alumni
1981 births
Living people
Male actors from Tokyo